Morombe is a district of Atsimo-Andrefana in Madagascar.

Communes
The district is further divided into eight communes:

 Ambahikily
 Antanimeva
 Antongo Vaovao
 Basibasy
 Befandefa
 Befandriana Sud
 Morombe
 Nosy Ambositra

References 

Districts of Atsimo-Andrefana